PPF may refer to:

Political and related organizations
The Participatory Politics Foundation a US non-profit organization
 Parti Populaire Français, a French fascist party active before and during World War Two
 Pirate Party (France), a former French political party
Progressive Policies Forum, a UK organization involved in a 2008 scandal over Peter Hain's campaign
Public Policy Forum, a Canadian think tank

Financial topics
Pension Protection Fund, a UK body responsible for paying pension compensation 
PPF (company), a financial group
Production–possibility frontier, a graph on the goods that an economy could efficiently produce with limited productive resources
Public Patent Foundation, a US non-profit organization
Public Provident Fund, a savings-cum-tax-saving instrument in India

Scientific topics
 Percent Point Function for the calculation of statistical quantiles.
Photosynthetic Photon Flux, see Photosynthetic photon flux density
Propofol, a drug used to induce anesthesia
 Public Psychiatry Fellowship at Columbia University Department of Psychiatry

Other uses
Pacific Pro Football
Paint protection film
Philippine Pickleball Federation
Print production format, a file format in the print industry
Program of Priestly Formation, a document by the United States Conference of Catholic Bishops on the formation of priests in the Roman Catholic Church